Gyan Bharti Model Residential Complex (GBMRC), shortened as Gyan Bharti, is a CBSE-affiliated school located 3 km east of Hisua City, Bihar, India.

Classes run up to tenth grade; it has a hostel facility for boys and teachers and a small sports ground in the back. The school also provides transportation facilities to students only. It is run by a society headed by Arun Kumar, who is a sitting member of parliament.

School conducts various events. Science Exhibition and Anand Mela is held every year in the month of November. Annual Day is celebrated in January every year; Arun Kumar attends as chief guest. Various cultural activities like dance, singing and drama are performed by the students.

Transportation 
The school has transportation facilities for students and teachers.

References

External links 
Gyan Bharti

Nawada district
High schools and secondary schools in Bihar
2003 establishments in Bihar
Educational institutions established in 2003